Kemal Özdeş (born 10 May 1970) is a Turkish football manager and former player who most recently served as manager of Süper Lig club Yeni Malatyaspor.

Personal

He was born in Manisa, Turkey. He graduated from Manisa Celal Bayar University in 1994.

Career

Managerial statistics

References

External links
 Player profile at TFF.org
 Coach profile at TFF.org
 
 Kemal Özdeş at Footballdatabase

1970 births
Living people
Sportspeople from Manisa
Turkish footballers
Turkish football managers
Manisaspor managers
Süper Lig managers
Association football midfielders
Yeni Malatyaspor managers
Manisa Celal Bayar University alumni